Schuler is a hamlet in southern Alberta, Canada within Cypress County, located  east of Highway 41, approximately  northeast of Medicine Hat.

Demographics 

History 
The settlement was named after Norman Banks Schuler, who settled a homestead in the area in the spring of 1910. In the fall of that year he was given the Post Office for the district.  The hamlet itself acts as a service centre for people on the surrounding farms.  Grain elevators were built by the Alberta Wheat Pool in 1924 and 1928 and by the Pioneer Grain Company in 1928.
In July 1997, the last train hauled grain from the two remaining elevators. It is home to an ECS to Grade 9 school.

See also 
List of communities in Alberta
List of designated places in Alberta
List of hamlets in Alberta

References 

Cypress County
Hamlets in Alberta
Designated places in Alberta